Liberty Township is one of twenty-five townships in Barry County, Missouri, United States. As of the 2000 census, its population was 1,105.

Liberty Township was established in 1858, and named for the American ideal of liberty.

Geography
It contains five cemeteries: Chitwood, Concord, Creason, Packwood and Vineyard.

The stream of Talbert Branch runs through this township.

References

 USGS Geographic Names Information System (GNIS)

External links
 US-Counties.com
 City-Data.com

Townships in Barry County, Missouri
Townships in Missouri